Russell is a 
given name that originated from the surname Russell, which in turn derives from the French name russel (Old Norse rossel) "red-haired, from  rus (Old Norse ros) "red hair color" and the suffix -el. Russell may be shortened to Russ or Rusty.

Notable people with the name include:

People
Russell Ackoff (1919–2009), American organizational theorist
Russell Allen (born 1971), American singer
Russell Alger (1836–1907), American politician
Russell Baker (1925–2019), American writer
Russell Banks (born 1940), American writer
Russell Brand (born 1975), British television presenter and comedian
Russell Branyan (born 1975), American baseball player
Russell G. Cleary (1933–1997), American businessman
Russell Coutts (born 1962), New Zealand sailor
Russell Crowe (born 1964), New Zealand born, Australian actor
Russell T Davies (born 1963), British screenwriter and producer
Russell Dickerson (born 1987), American country music singer
Russell G. Dunmore (1884–1935), New York politician
Russell Drysdale (1912–1981), Australian painter
Russell Feingold (born 1953), United States Senator from Wisconsin
Russell Gage (born 1996), American football player
Russell Gilbert (born 1959), Australian comedian
Russell Grant (born 1951), British astrologer
Russell Hansbrough (born 1993), American football player
Russell Hantz (born 1972), American oil company owner and three-time Survivor contestant
Russell Harty (1934–1988), British television presenter
Russell Henderson (1924–2015), Trinidad-born jazz musician
Russell F. Hicks (1820–1869), New York lawyer and politician
Russell Hinder, (born 1979), Australian basketball player
Russell Hoban (1925–2011), American writer
Russell Hogg (1968–2012), Scottish badminton player
Russell Howard (born 1980), British comedian
Russell P. Hughes (born 1946), American/British chemist
Russell Alan Hulse (born 1950), American physicist
Russell Johnson (1924–2014), American actor
Russell Kane (born 1975), English writer, comedian, and actor
Russell Kirk (1918–1994), American political theorist
Russell Kun (born 1966), Nauruan politician
Russell Lissack (born 1981), British guitarist
Russell M. Little (1809–1891), New York state senator
Russell Long (1918–2003), American politician
Russell Lynes (1910–1991), American art historian and photographer
Russell Martin (born 1983), Canadian baseball player
Russell Mael (born 1948), American rock singer
Russell Malone (born 1963), American jazz guitarist
Russell Means (1939–2012), Oglala Lakota activist
Russell Mehta, Indian businessman
Russell Miller (born  1938), British journalist and author of fifteen books, including biographies
Russell A. Miller (born 1969), American law professor (Washington and Lee University)
Russell D. Moore (born 1971), American theologian
Russell Mulcahy (born 1953), Australian director
Russell M. Nelson (born 1924), American surgeon and religious leader of the Church of Jesus Christ of Latter-day Saints
Russell Penn (born 1985), English footballer
Russell Peters (born 1970), Canadian comedian and actor
Russell Peterson (1916–2011), American politician
Russell Sage (1816–1906), American financier and politician
Russell Simmons (born 1957), American entrepreneur
Russell Tovey (born 1981), British actor
Russell Westbrook (born 1988), American basketball player
Russell Wilson (born 1988), American football player
Russell Wong (born 1963), American actor
Russell Williams (disambiguation), several people

Fictional characters
Russell Bell, in the television series The Wire
Russell (The Hitchhiker's Guide to the Galaxy), in The Hitchhiker's Guide to the Galaxy
Russell Edgington, in True Blood
Russell Ferguson, a hedgehog from the animated children's series Littlest Pet Shop.
Russell, a hedgehog from the animated film Once Upon a Forest
Russell Hammond, a main character in the film Almost Famous
Russell, in the television series Happy Tree Friends
Russell Wright, the title character from the Canadian animated series King
Russell, one of the main characters from the 2009 Pixar movie Up
Russell the Muscly Kangaroo, from the Hooley Dooleys
Russell Lightbourne, the main antagonist of The 100's sixth season
Russell Adler, a character in Call of Duty: Black Ops Cold War

See also
Russ (disambiguation)
Russel (disambiguation)
Russell (surname)
Rush (name)
Roussel (surname)

References

English masculine given names